U.S. Route 9 (US 9) is a part of the United States Numbered Highway System that runs from Laurel, Delaware, to Champlain, New York. In New York, US 9 extends  from the George Washington Bridge in Manhattan to an interchange with Interstate 87 (I-87) just south of the Canada–United States border in the town of Champlain. US 9 is the longest north–south U.S. Highway in New York. The portion of US 9 in New York accounts for more than half of the highway's total length.

The section of US 9 in New York passes through busy urban neighborhoods, suburban strips, and forested wilderness. It is known as Broadway in Upper Manhattan, the Bronx and much of Westchester County, and uses parts of the old Albany Post Road in the Hudson Valley, where it passes the historic homes of a U.S. President  (Franklin D. Roosevelt) and Gilded Age heir. It passes through the downtown of Albany, the state capital, as well as Saratoga Springs. It penetrates into the deep recesses of the Adirondack Park and runs along the shore of Lake Champlain, where it is part of the All-American Road known as the Lakes to Locks Passage.

US 9 spawns more letter-suffixed state highways than any other route in New York, including the longest,  New York State Route 9N (NY 9N). Outside of the cities it passes through, it is a mostly a two-lane road, save for two expressway segments in the mid-Hudson region. For much of its southern half, it follows the Hudson River closely; in the north it tracks I-87 (Adirondack Northway).

Route description

The New York segment of US 9 can be divided into the section south of Albany, which parallels the Hudson River closely, and the portion north of Albany, which takes in a long section of the eastern Adirondacks. New York State Bicycle Route 9 follows the US 9 corridor, diverging from the route in areas not conducive to bicycling. For example, State Bicycle Route 9 follows US 9W in northern New Jersey and Rockland County, crosses the Bear Mountain Bridge, and follows NY 9D and NY 301 back to US 9 in Putnam County.

New York City and the Hudson Valley
US 9 enters New York as part of an expressway, soon becoming a surface street and major urban and suburban artery. Outside of the expressway portions, it is mostly a two- or four-lane road save for a lengthy four-lane strip that leads into one of the expressways. It runs near the river more frequently in the southern areas, but it is never very far inland.

New York City

The concurrency between US 1 and US 9 that began in New Jersey ends at the first exit from I-95 on the George Washington Bridge, when US 9 heads north via 178th and 179th streets to Broadway. Broadway passes through the Washington Heights neighborhood and then into Inwood, the northernmost neighborhood on the island. The region in which US 9 passes through has a large Latino immigrant population. The northernmost section of the New York City Subway's underground IND Eighth Avenue Line ( train) runs along Broadway between Dyckman Street and Inwood–207th Street stations. On the corner of 204th Street is the Dyckman House, the only original farmhouse left in Manhattan and a National Historic Landmark (NHL).

Near the island's northern tip, at the intersection with 215th Street, the elevated IRT Broadway–Seventh Avenue Line ( train) of the New York City Subway joins Broadway. At the very tip of Manhattan, just past Columbia University's Robert K. Kraft Field at Lawrence A. Wien Stadium, US 9 crosses the Harlem River Ship Canal via the Broadway Bridge, into Marble Hill, the only portion of Manhattan on the mainland. Marble Hill station here is the first of several along US 9.

At or just south of 230th Street, US 9, still Broadway, enters the Bronx. It draws alongside I-87, here the Major Deegan Expressway, the first of many encounters between the two roads on their northward course. At Van Cortlandt Park–242nd Street station, the subway ends and Broadway runs along the west side of Van Cortlandt Park. The Henry Hudson Parkway interchange  up this stretch adds NY 9A to US 9.

Westchester County
 The northwestern corner of the park marks the city limit and US 9 enters Yonkers, where it is now known as South Broadway. It trends closer to the Hudson River, remaining a busy urban commercial street. In downtown Yonkers, it drops close to the river, becomes North Broadway and NY 9A leaves via Ashburton Avenue. US 9 climbs to the nearby ridgetop runs parallel to the river and the railroad, a few blocks east of both as it passes St. John's Riverside Hospital. The neighborhoods become more residential and the road gently undulates along the ridgetop. In Yonkers, US 9 passes Philipse Manor Hall State Historic Site, which dates back to colonial America.

The trees become taller and the houses, many separated from the road by stone fences, become larger. Another National Historic Landmark, the Henry Draper Observatory, was the site of the first astrophotograph of the Moon.

In the next village, Dobbs Ferry, US 9 has various views of the Hudson River while passing through the residential section. The highway passes by the Croton Aqueduct and nearby the shopping district of the village. After intersecting with Ashford Avenue, US 9 passes Mercy College, then turns left again at the center of town just past South Presbyterian Church, headed for equally comfortable Irvington. Villa Lewaro, the home of Madam C. J. Walker (1867–1919), the first African-American millionaire, is along the highway here. At the north end of the village of Irvington, a memorial to writer Washington Irving, after whom the village was renamed, marks the turnoff to his home at Sunnyside. Entering into the southern portion of Tarrytown, US 9 passes by the historic Lyndhurst mansion, a massive mansion built along the Hudson River in the early 1800s.

North of here, at the Kraft Foods technical center, the Tappan Zee Bridge becomes visible. After crossing over the New York State Thruway and I-87, here concurrent with I-287, and then intersecting with the four-lane NY 119, where NY 119 splits off to the east, US 9 becomes the busy main street of Tarrytown. Christ Episcopal Church, where Irving worshiped, is along the street. Many high quality restaurants and shops are along this main road. This downtown ends at the eastern terminus of NY 448, where US 9 slopes off to the left, downhill, and two signs indicate that US 9 turns left, passing the Old Dutch Church of Sleepy Hollow, another NHL. The road then enters Sleepy Hollow (formerly North Tarrytown), passing the visitors' center for Kykuit, the NHL that was (and partially still is) the Rockefeller family's estate. US 9 then passes historic Sleepy Hollow Cemetery, which includes the resting place of Washington Irving and the setting for "The Legend of Sleepy Hollow".

US 9 expands to four lanes at the trumpet intersection with NY 117; Broadway finally ends and US 9 becomes Albany Post Road. Entering Ossining's downtown, US 9 becomes Highland Avenue and continues to rise and fall, widen and narrow, through the riverside community. US 9 passes in close proximity to Sing Sing correctional facility before heading toward Croton.

Croton Expressway
The only section built of the canceled I-487, the highway is generally built to Interstate standards. NY 9A leaves the freeway and returns to two lanes, following the parent route's old course, at the second exit in Croton-on-Hudson, where NY 129 reaches its western end. US 9 passes Indian Point Energy Center, a nuclear powerplant that supplies power to Westchester County and New York City. The facility is visible from the majority of the northern half of the expressway.

The expressway veers inland for much of its route, preferring to follow the railroad tracks (the new Cortlandt station is visible to the west at one point), rather than the river past the promontory at Buchanan. NY 9A, as a surface street, ends at its parent at the Welcher Street exit. It continues on a reconstructed, widened section through Peekskill. Despite recent upgrades to freeway standards, the northern end of the highway still maintains a lower  speed limit.

 from the freeway's northern terminus, US 202 and US 6 join the freeway. NY 35 reaches its western terminus at that same junction. The four-lane divided highway's northern terminus is at a stoplight at a three-way intersection with the Bear Mountain State Parkway. The parkway continues straight from this intersection while US 6/US 9/US 202 turns left and crosses Annsville Creek.

Peekskill to Poughkeepsie

While US 6 and US 202 remain concurrent and exit the circle on its west side, continuing up the river toward the Bear Mountain Bridge, US 9 exits the roundabout on the northeast side. It continues due north as the two-lane Albany Post Road. Running inland and mostly free of development behind the Hudson Highlands, it enters Putnam County. NY 403 reaches its eastern terminus at the same intersection where the Appalachian Trail crosses the road. The gas station here has, when in service, long been a favorite stop for thru-hikers. A few miles further to the north, at the Indian Brook Road intersection in the Indian Brook Road Historic District, the highway passes through Nelson's Corner, a rare surviving early 19th-century country hamlet. Old Albany Post Road, a  remnant of US 9's original and one of the oldest dirt roads still in use in the country, comes in from the right  on.

US 9 passes Dutchess Mall, a dead mall, before passing the historic Van Wyck Homestead Museum. In Fishkill, the route meets I-84. At the Interstate exit, the road expands into a four-lane strip similar to the form it takes in Central New Jersey, complete with much commercial development on both sides. It will remain this way to Poughkeepsie. This stretch is an important, if often congested, transportation artery for the county.

Just north of I-84, US 9 clips off a corner of the village of Fishkill, where the intersection with NY 52 creates a heavily congested situation at rush hours since traffic going from southbound US 9 to westbound I-84 often uses it as a shortcut. The remaining miles to Wappingers Falls boast many intersections as well but are not quite as heavy.

In the town of Poughkeepsie, just after the northern terminus of NY 9D, US 9 passes another distressed mall, the Shoppes at South Hills, and its healthier, newer counterpart, the Poughkeepsie Galleria.  further north, NY 113 swings to the west at a cloverleaf interchange near the IBM plant, once the region's major employer. Entering the city of Poughkeepsie, at Sharon Drive, US 9 returns to expressway status once again.  north of Sharon, the highway connects to the US 44/NY 55 concurrency at an interchange in close proximity to the Mid-Hudson Bridge. This creates some unusual left exits, as traffic from US 44/NY 55 east wanting to go north on US 9 is routed into a U-turn south of the highway, and, likewise, northbound drivers on US 9 must get turned around to go west over the river. The limited-access highway comes to an end at the intersection with NY 9G near Marist College.

Poughkeepsie to Albany

North of Poughkeepsie, US 9 is at first a busy four-lane undivided route, with occasional turn lanes as it approaches Hyde Park, passing Marist College, the main campus of the Culinary Institute of America and then the home and presidential library of native Franklin D. Roosevelt. It narrows to two lanes at the built-up area that marks the center of town, then opens up a turn lane for traffic entering the third of the town's tourist attractions, Vanderbilt Mansion National Historic Site.

Past Hyde Park, the road narrows to two lanes again as traffic becomes more local. The area recalls Westchester County with many wooded tracts and stone walls at roadside. Through here, it has been running fairly close to the river, but, after Staatsburg, the highway begins to veer inland again. The land to the west, between road and river, forms the Hudson River Historic District, the largest in the country and another National Historic Landmark.

At Weys Corners, the X-shaped intersection north of Rhinebeck, northbound traffic to the river and the Kingston–Rhinecliff Bridge via NY 199 typically bears left onto NY 9G. Southbound traffic, in turn, takes NY 199 itself to the river when the two meet in Red Hook  further ahead. Two blocks north of that junction are the Village Diner, originally named the Halfway Diner since it was roughly halfway along US 9 from New York City to Albany, and the Elmendorph Inn, a mid-18th century counterpart to the diner. North of Red Hook, the land around the road begins to open up into farms and fields, offering frequent views of the Catskill Escarpment across the river. This terrain continues into Columbia County, which US 9 enters  beyond Red Hook.

The road remains two lanes, with mostly local traffic and no stop signs or traffic lights, until the oblique four-way intersection in Bell Pond,  into the county. Here, NY 23 joins US 9 as it heads west, which in turn joins NY 9H on the northern roadway while NY 82 departs to the southeast.

On the east fringe of Hudson's historic downtown, US 9 intersects the northern terminus of NY 9G and NY 23B. NY 23B runs concurrent with US 9 for a short distance eastward before splitting at Fairview Avenue, which US 9 follows out of Hudson. A commercial strip with turn lane gives way after  to the lightly traveled rural two-lane US 9 north of Hudson. Near Stockport, US 9 meets the southern terminus of NY 9J. Farther north, after passing through Kinderhook, home of another U.S. president, Martin Van Buren, the road passes under NY 9H at a grade-separated interchange before intersecting the northern terminus of NY 9H a short distance later outside Valatie. When a developer wanted to add a fifth leg to this intersection for a new shopping center, the New York State Department of Transportation required the developer to convert the signalized intersection to a roundabout, despite heavy local opposition.

The highway widens to four lanes with a turn lane shortly after crossing into Renesslaer County and will remain so for most of the rest of the way to Albany, despite limited development and low traffic in some areas.

As the roadway heads westward, it meets the western (southern for state purposes) terminus of US 4 across from a Hannaford Brothers Company supermarket along the busy commercial strip in East Greenbush. Shortly afterward, the first sign of the state capital, the Erastus Corning Tower, starts becoming visible. At a bluff east of the river, the entire Albany skyline comes into view as the road descends, passing the northern terminus of NY 9J south of Rensselaer. US 9 and US 20 then cross the Hudson River via the Dunn Memorial Bridge into Albany as Corning Tower and the other buildings of the Empire State Plaza loom ahead, and the two routes separate, with US 20 heading west across the city.

Albany and North
North of Albany, US 9 starts to pull away from the Hudson corridor, eventually picking up I-87, now the Adirondack Northway.

Albany to Saratoga Springs
After the bridge, US 9 runs under I-787 for several blocks, then takes an offramp past the Albany Pump Station to become Clinton Avenue. There, it intersects the two routes which have paralleled US 9 up the west side of the Hudson. At Pearl Street and the Palace Theatre, it crosses NY 32 (North Pearl Street), which continues north, and US 9W (Lark Street), which ends at the junction. US 9 turns north on Henry Johnson Boulevard and widens to cross I-90 again via a flyover originally built for the canceled Mid-Crosstown Arterial, exiting the city of Albany in the process.

Just before reaching the northern suburb of Colonie, US 9 returns to two lanes and follows Loudon Road through well-to-do residential neighborhoods past Samaritan Hospital and Wolferts Roost Country Club. The short NY 377 forks off to the north while US 9 trends slightly westward. A five-way intersection marks Loudonville. Siena College in Newtonville is on the east side  past the junction, with the Colonie Town Hall opposite.

Continuing northward into Latham, the highway adds a middle turn lane. NY 155 intersects as the Northway draws near to the west. Beyond, the road expands to four lanes and commercial property resumes. At the Latham Circle, US 9 crosses beneath NY 2.  further north, the expressway portion of NY 7 crosses over for eastbound traffic and then NY 9R goes off to the east, to return  further north. At the junction, US 9 starts to trend eastward again, away from the Northway and finally crosses the Mohawk River into Saratoga County via the Crescent Bridge at the northernmost point of Albany County.

A new name, Halfmoon Parkway, comes with the change of county, after the town the road runs through. The eastward bent reverses itself as another state route, NY 236 forks off to the north. By the time US 9 reaches the NY 146 junction in Clifton Park, the Northway is right alongside again. The roads continue running parallel courses past Round Lake as NY 67 joins US 9 into Malta, leaving  later at the center of town for its own exit along the Northway. Another  to the north, another lettered subroute of US 9, NY 9P, leaves east for Saratoga Lake.

This full cloverleaf is the main exit for Saratoga Springs. The resort town's historic downtown is  ahead, past Saratoga Spa State and Congress parks. Here, US 9, as South Broadway, begins a concurrency with NY 50 and, later, briefly, with NY 29. NY 9P completes its loop here, and another lettered route, NY 9N, the longest letter-suffixed route in the state, begins at the post office. Tacking eastward out of town, US 9 and NY 50 follow Van Dam Street until US 9 returns to a northerly course on Marion Avenue, which becomes Maple Avenue at the city limit.

Saratoga Springs to Lake George
Once past the sleeve of development around the highway north of the city, US 9 leaves the Capital District as it gets less developed through Wilton and Moreau. The Palmerstown Range begins to rise on one side, anticipating the mountainous country to come. From the hamlet of Kings Station onward, what is now signed as Saratoga Road follows a straight northeast course for  through more wooded countryside to the entrance to Moreau Lake State Park.  further on, US 9 again intersects the Northway at exit 17.

Another  brings it to the western end of NY 197 (Reynolds Road). US 9 continues straight ahead for the next  into the village of South Glens Falls, where NY 32 (Gansevoort Road) comes in at an oblique angle from the south and merges with US 9 to cross the Hudson via the Cooper's Cave Bridge for the last time, leaving Saratoga County and entering the Warren County city of Glens Falls.

The two routes follow Glen Street to Centennial Circle, a five-legged roundabout in the center of the city's downtown area, where NY 32 leaves to the right via Warren Street and NY 9L takes Ridge Street due north. US 9 continues via Glen to the northwest, becoming Upper Glen Street at the city limit. NY 254 (Aviation Road) comes in from its nearby western terminus at the Northway. The highway remains heavily developed for the next  to a junction with another route beginning at I-87, NY 149. It joins with US 9 briefly before leaving to the east north of the Adirondack–Lake George Outlet Mall. Many vehicles make that turn, as NY 149 is the best route from the Northway into southern Vermont,  to the east.

US 9 continues to parallel the Interstate. At the Queensbury–Lake George town line, a massive wooden shingle lets drivers know they have crossed the Blue Line into the Adirondack Park. The route straightens out for the next  into the village of Lake George, a popular tourist destination.

It takes the name Canada Street, and NY 9N comes in from the west to run concurrently with. The two routes widen to a busy four-lane road past shops catering to a busy tourist trade. Shortly thereafter, NY 9L loops back to the parent route, after having followed the east shore of the lake that gives the village its name. At the northern end of the village of Lake George, NY 9N splits via Lake Shore Drive to follow the western shore, and US 9 itself takes a northwesterly turn to remain parallel with the Northway.

Adirondack Park

Past Lake George, US 9 enters the Adirondack Park. The next  of the highway runs through the eastern section of the largest protected area east of the Mississippi River,  with vast tracts of Forest Preserve kept "forever wild" per the state constitution. Accordingly, US 9 remains a two-lane rural road, often very close to the Adirondack Northway, a section of I-87, throughout the park. Development, traffic, and population are minimal, the surrounding land is heavily wooded, and the two roads cover very long distances between very small towns.

After Lake George, there is another exit with the Northway, to ease access to the village by southbound traffic. This serves Warrensburg, where NY 418 reaches its eastern terminus. The highway begins to move further away from the interstate, and,  further, NY 28 concludes its long bow-shaped route at a junction with US 9.

This exit serves only northbound traffic.  later, there is access to the other direction.

The road begins to run along the west shore of Schroon Lake, in the process crossing into Essex County. Shortly after the county line, an access road leads to I-87 again. Signs at this junction use Ticonderoga,  to the east, as a control city, an indication of how sparsely populated the park is.

US 9 remains close to the interstate for the next  into the town of North Hudson, where Boreas Road provides access to the Dix Mountain Wilderness Area the southernmost in the Adirondack High Peaks region. The highway again crosses the interstate to connect I-87 to the western terminus of NY 73, the well-traveled scenic route to Keene Valley and Lake Placid.

The right turn takes it again to the northeast past Rocky Peak Ridge and the Giant Mountain Wilderness Area, to the hamlet of New Russia. This  stretch brings the highway to Elizabethtown, the unincorporated county seat and the first settlement US 9 has passed through since Warrensburg. NY 9N comes through town from the west; it and US 9 briefly overlap.

While the land remains mostly forested as the road continues its northeast course from Elizabethtown, it begins to descend somewhat as the valley of Lake Champlain draws near. US 9 eventually draws close to the Northway again at Poke-O-Moonshine Mountain, the Adirondacks' most popular climbing spot. In Chesterfield,  without a major highway junction are ended when NY 22 joins US 9 after its exit, the first pairing of two highways that begin their journey upstate in New York City.

The two routes enter Keeseville, where, in mid-village, they cross the Ausable River and enter Clinton County. NY 9N reappears here, reaching its northern terminus. North of the village, the two routes split again and exchange the roles they had been playing for their entire northward journey. US 9 takes the eastward fork to the lake, running close to the state's edge; while NY 22 will run inland from here to the border.

After Keeseville, US 9 follows AuSable Chasm down to the lake shore. It crosses the Ausable and briefly reenters Essex County long enough for the short NY 373 to provide access to the Burlington–Port Kent Ferry. A third and final crossing takes it out the Adirondack Park.

Lake Champlain, Plattsburgh, and Canada
After US 9 passes Ausable Marsh Wildlife Management Area and NY 442 comes in from the east at the small hamlet of Peru, US 9 heads down to the shore of the lake itself, which it will stay close to all the way into Plattsburgh as Lakes to Locks Passage. On clear days, it is possible to see Burlington across the water. Ahead lies Valcour Island. In the narrow, rocky strait between it and the shore, Benedict Arnold's hastily built fleet held off the British Army on October 11, 1776, in the Battle of Valcour Island in what is considered the first battle in U.S. naval history. More recent military history is apparent shortly thereafter when US 9 passes now-closed Plattsburgh Air Force Base, a pillar of the regional economy Plattsburgh has struggled to replace.

When it actually enters Plattsburgh, it becomes first U.S. Avenue, then Peru Street when it passes the Old Catholic Cemetery. The Saranac River draws alongside twice before US 9 takes a left turn at Bridge Street and crosses it. Just past the bridge, the highway turns left again onto City Hall Place at the center of town. US 9 passes in front of the City Hall designed by John Russell Pope, also the builder of the Jefferson Memorial in Washington DC. Two more quick lefts follow past the large obelisk of Riverside Park, onto Miller and Cornelia streets, and then US 9 turns right at the eastern terminus of the lengthy NY 3 to follow Margaret Street north and out of the city.

It bends northeast to return to the lake shore shortly after the city limit, following alongside Cumberland Bay. At the Dead Creek crossing, US 9 widens to four lanes for the first time since the Albany area to handle the heavy traffic at the junction with the eastern terminus of NY 314, which continues east on County Route 57 (CR 57) to another ferry connector, just southeast of the Northway.  north of the junction, after North Country Shopping Center, the highway returns to two lanes and the name Lakes to Locks Passage as it overlooks Woodruff Pond and Treadwell Bay. I-87 is visible  to the east across the many open fields as the two roads parallel each other's turns closely.

Another short route, CR 58, formerly NY 456, comes in from the west and terminates at US 9 shortly after the right turn for Point Au Roche State Park. Continuing northward, the road deviates to the east slightly in the town of Chazy but returns to its previous track by the Interstate at the Little Chazy River bridge. Shortly afterward, US 9 intersects CR 23 (Miner Farm Road, formerly NY 191 west of US 9).

US 9 runs straight due north, no longer taking another name,  to the next major intersection, NY 9B (Lavalley Road), its last subroute. NY 9B does not terminate but instead runs to the lake shore and eventually north to Rouses Point. A bend slightly to the west, closer to the Northway, brings the next  stretch to US 9's last major intersection, US 11, just south of Champlain.

US 9 winds through the quiet border village as its Main Street, turning west-northwest near Champlain's northern boundary to make its last water crossing over the Chazy River. The route, still known as Main Street, heads northwest toward the Northway to follow it for the last , passing a few customs brokerages toward its official end at the on-ramp to the last exit. Traffic to Canada must get on I-87 here.

The roadway continues as the East Service Road, unsigned NY 971B, for another . This was the former route of US 9 to the border prior to the construction of the Northway.

History

Origins
South of Albany, the main route of travel before the 20th century was the Albany Post Road, wending from New York City to a ferry at Greenbush. North of Albany, US 9 replaced the Great Northern Road, which ran from the Hudson River near Glen Falls through Schroon Lake and Elizabethtown to the Canadian border; this road became a toll road in the 1800s, known as the Great Northern Turnpike. In the early 20th century, much of the Albany Post Road was signed as an auto trail of the same name, though south of Tarrytown the trail skewed eastward along Nepperan and Sleepy Hollow roads to Elmsford; Hartsdale Road to Hartsdale; Central Avenue, Jerome Avenue, and the Grand Concourse to Manhattan; and 149th Street, 7th Avenue, 110th Street, and 5th Avenue to Washington Square.

Much of what is now US 9 in New York was assigned an unsigned legislative route designation by the New York State Legislature in 1908. Route 2 joined modern US 9 at Archville (north of Tarrytown) and followed it north to Croton-on-Hudson, where it turned off to the northeast on modern NY 129. The legislative route rejoined what is now US 9 at Peekskill and remained on it to Valatie, where it met Route 1. Route 2 ended here while Route 1 continued north to Albany on current US 9. From Albany to Clifton Park and from South Glens Falls to Riparius, modern US 9 was part of Route 25. At Riparius, Route 25 met Route 22, which utilized what is now US 9 from Riparius to Elizabethtown and from Keeseville to the town of Champlain. While modern US 9 travels directly from Elizabethtown to Keeseville and bypasses Rouses Point to the west, Route 25 used current NY 9N between Elizabethtown and Keeseville and served Rouses Point via modern NY 9B. Route 2 and Route 25 were realigned slightly on March 1, 1921, to utilize the modern US 9 corridor from Croton-on-Hudson to Peekskill and from Saratoga Springs to South Glens Falls, respectively.

When the first set of posted routes in New York were assigned in 1924, the general routing of modern US 9 was designated as New York State Route 6 (NY 6), which went from the New York City line at Yonkers north to the Canadian border near Rouses Point. From New York City, NY 6 followed current US 9 north to Tarrytown, where it joined legislative Route 2 and continued north through Valatie to Albany via legislative Route 1 and Route 2. North of Albany, NY 6 served Cohoes, Mechanicville, and Round Lake via modern NY 32 and NY 67. At Round Lake, NY 6 rejoined the path of current US 9 and headed north to Saratoga Springs. Past Saratoga Springs, NY 6 continued to Rouses Point on legislative Route 22 and Route 25. NY 6 had two spur routes: NY 6A in Westchester County and NY 6B in Rensselaer and Saratoga counties.

Designation

In the original 1925 plan for the U.S. Numbered Highway System, US 9 was designated along the west bank of the Hudson River from the New Jersey line to Albany, utilizing then-NY 10. North of Albany, US 9 mostly followed NY 6 to Canada. The lone deviation was from Elizabethtown to Keeseville, where US 9 was routed on a previously unnumbered highway to the east instead. NY 6 east of the Hudson (up to Rensselaer) and a further extension to Glens Falls via Troy, Mechanicville, and Schuylerville was designated as U.S. Route 109 (US 109). The alignment of US 9 within New York remained unchanged in the final system alignment approved on November 11, 1926. However, when US 9 was commissioned in New York in 1927, the US 109 designation had been dropped and was signed instead as U.S. Route 9E (US 9E), but only up to Waterford. The segment on the west bank of the Hudson from New Jersey to Waterford was redesignated as US 9W, with the split routes meeting in Waterford. From there, unsuffixed US 9 began (still along NY 6) and went up to the Canadian border via Rouses Point as planned in 1925.

The former routing of NY 6 between Elizabethtown and Keeseville, bypassed by US 9, became NY 9W at this time. A shorter, more inland alternate route between Albany and Round Lake was designated as NY 9C sometime in the late 1920s. In the 1930 renumbering of state highways in New York, the "E" suffix was dropped from all of US 9E south of East Greenbush—making it part of US 9—while US 9W was truncated southward to end in Albany. At the same time, US 9 was realigned between Albany and Round Lake to use what had been NY 9C. The Waterford–Mechanicville portion of US 9's former routing and the segment of US 9E between East Greenbush and Waterford became part of an extended US 4. The remainder of the old riverside route south of Waterford became part of NY 32 while the Round Lake–Mechanicville segment of old US 9 became part of NY 67.

Realignments
US 9 (and US 9E before it) originally crossed into New Jersey via the Edgewater Ferry in Harlem. It was shifted northward onto the George Washington Bridge when it opened in 1934. In mid-December 1934, US 9 was signed within New York City for the first time, as were several other U.S. Highways and state routes. US 9 followed the George Washington Bridge into Manhattan, where it continued east on 179th Street to Broadway. Here, US 9 turned north as it does today, following Broadway through Manhattan and the Bronx to Yonkers. The route was moved from 179th Street to the Cross Bronx Expressway  following the completion of the highway in the vicinity of the eastern bridge approach.

In the mid-1940s, the northern end of US 9 was realigned to enter Canada via Champlain instead of Rouses Point. The old route through Rouses Point became NY 9B. In the mid-1960s, the Adirondack Northway was completed in the vicinity of Champlain, supplanting the northernmost mile of US 9. US 9 initially overlapped with I-87 from exit 43 to the Canadian border; however, it was truncated to end at exit 43—the last interchange before the border—in the 1970s. Part of US 9's former routing to the border was retained as a service road and was designated as NY 971B, an unsigned reference route.

Croton Expressway
Since the 1940s, an expressway along the US 9 corridor on the east bank of the Hudson River had been planned. Part of the route later became the New York State Thruway (up to Tarrytown). In 1956, there were plans to continue the expressway further north to I-84 in Beacon and beyond. This was one of the proposed alignments for I-87.

In early 1965, this unconstructed expressway was assigned the designation I-487, allowing a commercial-vehicle-accessible means of travel on the east side of the Hudson River. By 1967, strong resident opposition caused the segment from Peekskill to Beacon to be canceled. In 1971, the section from Tarrytown to Ossining had also been canceled due to lack of public support. The only portion that was ever built was the section from Crotonville to Peekskill and was later named the Croton Expressway. The Croton Expressway opened in 1967 with the US 9 designation. The original surface alignment of US 9 became an extension of NY 9A.

Other developments

In Albany, US 9 was planned to be upgraded to an expressway. It was to run west from the Dunn Memorial Bridge along the South Mall Arterial (cosigned with US 20), then north along the northern half of the Mid-Crosstown Arterial. The southern half would carry US 9W. The Mid-Crosstown Arterial would have begun at the junction of I-787 and the New York State Thruway, connect with the South Mall Arterial at an underground interchange at Washington Park, and continue north to a junction with I-90. The only portion that was actually constructed was in the vicinity of the I-90 interchange (exit 6).

A study by the National Highway Traffic Safety Administration in 2009 found that US 9 was the deadliest highway in Dutchess County, with 47 fatal accidents on the road in the 1994–2008 period. Police in the town of Poughkeepsie blamed it on the increasing commercialization of US 9 south of the city of Poughkeepsie.

Suffixed routes
US 9 has had 19 suffixed routes bearing 17 different designations. Most are still in place; however, nine have been removed or renumbered. All the routes were assigned as part of the 1930 renumbering of state highways in New York unless otherwise noted.

 NY 9A is an alternate route of US 9 through Manhattan and Westchester County.
 NY 9B is a spur in Clinton County linking US 9 in Chazy to US 11 in Rouses Point. It was assigned in the mid-1940s.
The NY 9C designation has been used for two distinct highways:
The first NY 9C was an alternate route assigned to what is now US 9 between Albany and Round Lake in the 1920s. It became part of US 9 in the 1930 renumbering.
The second NY 9C was an alternate route of US 9 between Croton-on-Hudson and Peekskill, utilizing Mount Airy Road and Washington Street. The designation was eliminated in the early 1930s.
 NY 9D is an alternate route of US 9 between the Bear Mountain Bridge and Wappingers Falls.
 NY 9E was a spur linking US 9 to NY 376 (near Dutchess County Airport, present-day Hudson Valley Regional Airport) in the vicinity of Wappingers Falls, Dutchess County. It was assigned  and removed . The route, named New Hackensack Road, is now designated as CR 104 by Dutchess County.
 NY 9F was an alternate route of US 9 between Poughkeepsie and Hyde Park in Dutchess County. It became part of NY 9G .
 NY 9G is an alternate route of US 9 from Poughkeepsie, Dutchess County, to Hudson, Columbia County.
 NY 9H is an easterly alternate to US 9 between Bell Pond and Valatie. It was assigned .
 NY 9J is an alternate route of US 9 from Columbiaville to Rensselaer. NY 9J follows a more westerly alignment than US 9 to serve a series of communities along the Hudson River.
 NY 9K was an alternate route of US 9 between Saratoga Springs and Lake George. It was supplanted by an extended NY 9N in November 1953.
 NY 9L is a loop off of US 9 between Glens Falls and Lake George in Warren County.
 NY 9M was a spur located along the east bank of the Schroon River in Warren County. It connected US 9 near Pottersville to NY 8 in Starbuckville. The route was assigned  and removed .
 NY 9N is a lengthy alternate route of US 9 between Saratoga Springs and Keeseville. NY 9N is the longest suffixed route in New York.
 NY 9P is a loop route connecting US 9 to Saratoga Lake southeast of Saratoga Springs. It was assigned .
 NY 9R is a short loop serving Colonie in northeast Albany County. It was assigned .
NY 9W, different from present US 9W, was an alternate route of US 9 between Elizabethtown and Keeseville. It was assigned in 1927 and renumbered to NY 9N in the 1930 renumbering.
The NY 9X designation has been used for two distinct highways:
The first NY 9X was a loop route connecting US 9 to Saratoga Lake southeast of Saratoga Springs. It was assigned  and renumbered to NY 9P .
The second NY 9X was an alternate route of US 9 through New York City in the vicinity of the Harlem River. It was assigned in the mid-1930s and removed in the 1940s.

Major intersections
Other than a brief segment concurrent with I-95 and US 1, exits on US 9 are unnumbered.

See also

References

External links

 
09
Hudson River
Limited-access roads in New York (state)
Transportation in Manhattan
Transportation in the Bronx
Transportation in Westchester County, New York
Transportation in Putnam County, New York
Transportation in Dutchess County, New York
Transportation in Rensselaer County, New York
Transportation in Albany County, New York
Transportation in Columbia County, New York
Transportation in Saratoga County, New York
Transportation in Essex County, New York
Transportation in Clinton County, New York
Transportation in Warren County, New York